Óscar Patricio Reyes Sánchez (born 16 December 1957) is a retired Chilean football defender. He was part of Chile's squad for the 1987 Copa América tournament.

References

1957 births
Living people
Chilean footballers
Universidad de Chile footballers
San Marcos de Arica footballers
Deportes La Serena footballers
Association football defenders
Chile international footballers
People from Arica